Glenn B. Anderson is the first Black Deaf man to earn a doctoral degree. He is an active community member in the Black Deaf community. Dr Glenn B. Anderson is the author of a book titled "Still I Rise: The Enduring Legacy of Black Deaf Arkansans Before and After Integration". He is a current member of the board for the National Black Deaf Advocates and an editor for the Arkansas Association of the Deaf newsletter.

Early life and education 
Anderson was born on October 16, 1945, in inner-city Chicago, Illinois. He contracted pneumonia at the age of 7 and due to complications from the illness, he became deaf. Anderson attended a program with 150 other deaf students for both elementary school and middle school. For high school he attended Parker High School in a program with 15 other deaf students. Minimal support was provided and thus he struggled with understanding the teacher in class. He found a way to succeed academically and received honors and an award for scholar-athlete of the year. He graduated from Parker High School in 1964. Anderson attended Northern Illinois University with a concentration in physical education. After one semester he transferred to Gallaudet University. He became an active participant in the student body by joining various clubs and student athletic teams such as basketball, track and student body government. Anderson changed his major from physical education to psychology. In 1968 he graduated from Gallaudet and had the only black family at commencement. In 1970, he earned his master's degree from University of Arizona. In 1982, Anderson became the first Black Deaf man to earn a doctorate degree as he graduated from New York University with a Ph.D in Rehabilitation Counseling.

Career timeline 
Glenn B. Anderson started his counseling career in 1970 after graduating with a master's degree in Rehabilitation Counseling. He got a job in 1970 as a Vocational Rehabilitation Counselor in Detroit, becoming the first deaf person to be hired for that position in all of Michigan. After working for 2 years in that position, he started work at New York University in the Deafness Research and Training Center. He worked as an associate research scientist there for 3 years, from 1972 through to 1975. While pursuing his Ph.D., he worked at LaGuardia Community College, City University in New York. He worked as a Coordinator of Continuing Education Programs from 1975 through to 1982, the same year he obtained his Ph.D. He has participated in countless national workshops and conferences, and has led multiple university courses. In 2002–2005, Dr. Anderson was appointed by President George W. Bush as a member of the National Council of Disability. He is a current member of the board for the National Black Deaf Advocates and an editor for the Arkansas Association of the Deaf newsletter.

Written works 
Dr. Anderson has written many articles and journals; he has also written a book titled "Still I Rise: The Enduring Legacy of Black Deaf Arkansans Before and After Integration". This book was published in 2006 and is accompanied in a DVD format using American Sign Language.

Personal life  
Anderson met his wife, Karen, when he was a student at New York University. They later had two children, a boy named Jamaal and a girl named Danielle. They also have two grandchildren. Glenn B. Anderson's son Jamaal played as a defensive end for the National Football League. Jamaal Anderson has played for teams such as the Atlanta Falcons, the Indianapolis Colts, the Cincinnati Bengals and the Chicago Bears.

Awards and accolades

References 

1945 births
Living people
Gallaudet University alumni
University of Arizona alumni
Steinhardt School of Culture, Education, and Human Development alumni
American deaf people
New York University alumni